Calyptapis is an extinct bombini genus related to bumblebees with one described species Calyptapis florissantensis. It is known only from the Late Eocene Chadronian age shales of the Florissant Formation in Colorado. The genus and species were described by Theodore Dru Alison Cockerell in 1906.

References

†
Eocene insects
Fossil bee taxa
Fossil taxa described in 1906
Insects described in 1906
Prehistoric insects of North America
Fossil bee genera